Surjan can refer to:

 Jacob Surjan (born 1985), Australian rules footballer
 Surjan, Bosnia and Herzegovina, a village in Bosnia and Herzegovina
 Šurjan, a village in Serbia